Many sports leagues, sportswriting associations, and other organizations confer "Coach of the Year" awards.  In some sports — including baseball and association football — the award is called the "Manager of the Year" award.

Some of these are:
 AFCA Coach of the Year (American collegiate football) (US)
 Annis Stukus Trophy (Canadian Football League)
 Clair Bee Coach of the Year (NCAA Division I basketball) (US)
 Henry Iba Award (NCAA basketball) (US)
 IHJUK Coach of the Year Trophy (Ice Hockey Journalists UK)
 Jack Adams Award (National Hockey League) (Canada & US)
 Major Indoor Soccer League (US) Coach of the Year
 Major League Lacrosse (US) Coach of the Year
 Major League Soccer (US) Coach of the Year
 Naismith College Coach of the Year (NCAA Division I basketball) (US)
 National Basketball Association (US) Coach of the Year
 National Basketball League (Australia) Coach of the Year
 National Football League (US) Coach of the Year
 Swedish Ice Hockey Coach of the Year
 United States Olympic Committee Coach of the Year
 Women's National Basketball Association (US) Coach of the Year
 USA Swimming Golden Goggle Awards Coach of the Year

See also
Coach Award (BBC Sports Personality of the Year) (UK)
Best Coach/Manager ESPY Award (all sports) (US)
Manager of the Year Award (Major League Baseball) (US)
Football Manager of the Year (Germany)
Philips Sports Manager of the Year (Ireland)
Premier League Manager of the Season (England)